Ana Peláez Triviño (born 22 March 1998) is a Spanish professional golfer who plays on the Ladies European Tour. She won the 2022 Madrid Ladies Open in her debut tournament as a member.

Amateur career
Peláez was born in Málaga in 1998 and enjoyed an impressive amateur career, climbing to 11th spot in the World Amateur Golf Rankings.

After a runner-up finish in 2014, she won the 2015 Annika Invitational Europe. She reached the semifinals of the 2015 Girls Amateur Championship. Both were qualifying events for the Junior Solheim Cup, where she made the team and represented Europe in 2015. In 2016, she was runner-up at the French International Lady Juniors Amateur Championship. With the Spanish National Team, she won 2015 European Girls' Team Championship, and appeared in the European Ladies' Team Championship five years consecutively between 2017 and 2021, with best finish a silver behind Sweden in 2019. She finished 3rd at the Junior Golf World Cup in Japan together with Marta Pérez Sanmartin and María Parra Luque.

Peláez entered the University of South Carolina in 2016. She earned two All-America honors as a member of the South Carolina Gamecocks women's golf team and recorded the fourth best scoring average in program history (73.80). She earned medalist honors at the 2017 NCAA Columbus Regional as a freshman. She crowned her college career with a selection to play in the 2021 Arnold Palmer Cup.

In 2020, Peláez returned to action following the pandemic with five top-three finishes in amateur events in Spain, including a second place in the Campeonato De Espana Profesionales Femenino. She recorded a T13 finish at the European Ladies Amateur Championship in Slovenia and won the Madrid event on the Santander Golf Tour. She finished the year with a solo third in the Open de España Femenino, a Ladies European Tour event.

Peláez started 2021 with a five-stroke victory at the Copa Andalucia in her native Spain, successfully defending her 2020 title. She finished 12th at the Augusta National Women's Amateur and won the sectional qualifying at Druid Hills GC in Atlanta, Georgia for the 2021 U.S. Women's Open, her first major.

Professional career
Peláez turned professional on the eve of the Aramco Team Series – Sotogrande in July 2021, where she finished T42. Peláez finished in a tie for 83rd at LET Q-School in December, for a very limited status on the LET in 2022. She received an invitation to play in the Madrid Ladies Open, and secured a full LET card through victory. On her way to win in her debut tournament as a member, she shot a course record nine-under-par 63 in the penultimate round. She finished 23-under-par, six strokes clear of Linnea Ström in second.

Amateur wins 
2013 Copa Andalucia
2015 Annika Invitational Europe
2016 Campeonato de Madrid
2017 NCAA Columbus Regional
2020 Copa Andalucia
2021 Copa Andalucia

Source:

Professional wins (2)

Ladies European Tour wins (1)

Santander Golf Tour wins (1)

Team appearances
Amateur
Junior Solheim Cup (representing Europe): 2015
Junior Golf World Cup (representing Spain): 2016
European Girls' Team Championship (representing Spain): 2015 (winners), 2016
European Ladies' Team Championship (representing Spain): 2017, 2018, 2019, 2020, 2021
Arnold Palmer Cup (representing the International team): 2021

References

External links

Spanish female golfers
South Carolina Gamecocks women's golfers
Ladies European Tour golfers
Sportspeople from Málaga
1998 births
Living people
20th-century Spanish women
21st-century Spanish women